Petter Planke (born 7 March 1937) is a Norwegian businessperson, known for the foundation of Tomra.

He was born in Oslo to Sverre Martens Planke and Vivien Brath, and is a brother of Tore Planke. He married Grete Rønneberg in 1958.

Planke co-founded the industry company Tomra in 1972, along with his brother. He was thus a pioneer in the production of reverse vending machines. As of 2000, Tomra had about 75% of the world market of reverse vending machines. He was a board member of Norges Industriforbund from 1981 to 1985, and a member of the Norwegian Export Council from 1987 to 1989. He was decorated Knight, First Class of the Order of St. Olav in 2015.

References

1937 births
Living people
Businesspeople from Oslo
Norwegian company founders